is a music video game released in Japan in arcades on November 30, 2000. On the same day, it was also released for the PlayStation, but under the name . It was later released in September 2001 North America as Dance Dance Revolution Disney Mix and in Europe and Australia as Dancing Stage Disney Mix. It is based on Konami's Dance Dance Revolution (DDR) series with animated Disney characters and electronic dance music remixes of past Disney songs. They also include a few non-Disney songs that were popular at the time of the game's release. It is considered to be one of the rarest DDR game released in arcades.

Gameplay

Gameplay is typical to other 4th Mix generation DDR games. The game also features Dance Magic mode, an item battle mode using a tug of war style lifebar, where combos increase a gauge which sends modifiers to the other player. The mode was not seen on any future DDR game until it was revived as Battle mode on SuperNOVA.

Releases

Arcade 
The arcade release of Disney's Rave was historically available at a few Walt Disney Parks and Resorts locations, including Disneyland in Anaheim, California (at Innoventions) and Walt Disney World in Lake Buena Vista, Florida (at Innoventions West and Tomorrowland) The parks also carried other dance games which would eventually replace Disney's Rave, and conversely, Disney's Rave is also available at non-Disney locations.

Console 
The PlayStation version was the only version officially released outside Japan. The non-Japanese versions had slightly different song lists and included an unlockable "Maniac" difficulty level that could be reached once "Basic" and "Trick" difficulties were completed for each song. A Game Boy version of the game was also released in Japan.

Plug and play 
Konami partnered with Majesco Entertainment to release Dance Dance Revolution Disney Mix as a plug and play TV game with dance pad on December 12, 2006. It was originally sold exclusively at Walt Disney Parks and Resorts. The 8-bit video game is single-player only, with Arcade and Free Play modes, and is built into the basic dance pad. The song list is limited to nine chiptune renditions of Disney music. The game requires four AA batteries and uses built-in composite cables to connect to a television.

Music
The Disney games feature a total of 31 songs. The Japan-exclusive songs are licensed covers of non-Disney music, while the non-Japan exclusive songs are Konami original songs.

Reception

Dance Dance Revolution Disney Mix garnered "mixed or average" reviews from professional critics, according to aggregate website Metacritic, although it was widely recommended to fans of Disney and the Dance Dance Revolution series. Kim Wild, in a 2017 piece for Retro Gamer, described Disney's video games in the late-1990s and early 2000s-period before Kingdom Hearts (2002) as uninventive, capitalizing on established trends such as Mario Kart-esque racing video games, skateboarding games, and platformers. Dance Dance Revolution Disney Mix, for example, was part of the popularity of dance pad-controlled games.

The most discussed aspect of Dance Dance Revolution Disney Mix was its track list, which divided critics. The inclusion of both Disney covers and unrelated songs was appreciated as diverse by Jeuxvideo.com writer Pilou and Official U.S. PlayStation Magazine reviewer Joe Rybicki, while Jeff Gerstmann of GameSpot found it an "odd mix". David Smith was enthusiastic towards the Disney songs, elaborating that their amalgamation of child-like lyrics and hard techno styles separated the game from other DDR games. Less positively,  they were considered mediocre by Electronic Gaming Monthlys Chris Johnston and "awful Eurobeat remixes" by Gerstmann. Joe Rybicki enjoyed the non-Disney tracks more, particularly "Let's Twist Again" and cuts that were also in Japanese versions of other DDR games, arguing players would have to be Disney fans to enjoy dancing to the Disney renditions. The tracks were unfavorably compared to previous DDR games by Gerstmann, who found them "a little too similar to be exciting" which went against the "charm" of DDR games, and Miss Spell of GamePro, who opined they were not as "infectious" as other DDR titles. Miss Spell cited "Chim Chim Cheree” and "It’s a Small World (Ducking Hardcore Mix)" as the weakest songs. 

In terms of difficulty, critics summarized Normal and Trick was really easy and lacked any "feverish energy" in the step patterns, while Maniac was the only one to give adult DDR players a challenge. Electronic Gaming Monthlys Chris Johnston argued the game had little replay value due its small amount of songs, not helped by the Disney covers being forgettable. Modes such as two-player, Diet and Dance Magic were highlighted by Rybicki and Jeuxvideo.com writer Pilou, while Johnston disliked Dance Magic as "unbalanced and short-lived". Gerstmann and Pilou found the backgrounds un-noticeable and sufficing for the function they serve, although Gerstmann found the animation "a bit choppy". On the other hand, Miss Spell called them out as too stilted for a late-era PlayStation title with an animation license, and resulting in some steps accidentally camouflaging.

References

2000 video games
Arcade video games
Dance Dance Revolution games
Disney video games
Game Boy Color games
PlayStation (console) games
Video games developed in Japan
Video games developed in the United States
Video games developed in Germany